Mike Lovatt is a British trumpeter, currently the Derek Watkins Chair of Trumpet at Royal Academy of Music, and the Principal Trumpet of 'Superbrass' as well as the  John Wilson Orchestra.

References

External links

Academics of the Royal Academy of Music
British classical trumpeters
Male trumpeters
Living people
21st-century trumpeters
21st-century British male musicians
Year of birth missing (living people)
BBC Big Band members